Robin Chaigneau (born 2 September 1988 in Meerkerk) is a Dutch former cyclist.

Major results
2005
2nd Overall Trophée Centre Morbihan
2006
1st  Junior National Road Race Championships
2008
1st  World University Road Race Championships
1st Ronde van Overijssel
2009
3rd Ster van Zwolle
2012
1st Ster van Zwolle

References

1988 births
Living people
Dutch male cyclists
People from Zederik
20th-century Dutch people
21st-century Dutch people
Cyclists from Utrecht (province)